The 2022 ASUN Conference baseball tournament will be held at Swanson Stadium, home field of the Florida Gulf Coast Eagles baseball team in Fort Myers, Florida, from May 24 through 28.  The winner of the tournament will claim the ASUN Conference's automatic bid to the 2022 NCAA Division I baseball tournament.

Format and seeding
The two division winners plus the next two top teams by the RPI will be placed in Pool A, while the next four teams by RPI will be placed in Pool B.  Each pool will play a round-robin schedule, with the top three teams from Pool A and the Pool B winner advancing to the single-elimination semifinals, with the semifinal winners meeting for the championship.  The Pool A winner will play the Pool B winner in one semifinal and the Pool A runner-up will play the Pool A third place in the other semifinal.

Bracket and results
Pool A

Pool B

Semifinals and final

References

ASUN Conference Baseball Tournament
Tournament
ASUN Conference baseball tournament
College baseball tournaments in Florida
Baseball competitions in Fort Myers, Florida